Dhuseni may refer to:

Dhuseni, Gandaki, Nepal
Dhuseni, Mechi, Nepal